John Porter (born 11 September 1947, in Leeds, England) is an English musician and record producer.

Biography
He attended St Michael's School, Allerton Grange School, King's College, London, and Newcastle University.

While at Newcastle, Porter met singer Bryan Ferry, and was part of his fledgling band The Gas Board.  Ferry's later band Roxy Music had achieved success in the early 1970s, but having had some troubles with bass players, Ferry invited Porter on board to record the 1973 album For Your Pleasure and its subsequent tour. Porter went on to serve as a record producer for many later albums for Roxy Music and Bryan Ferry. Porter is credited with the production of Liverpool's Watt 4 album at Matrix Studios in 1979.

He has since produced for The Smiths, Billy Bragg, The Blades, Microdisney, School of Fish, B. B. King, Los Lonely Boys, Buddy Guy, Ryan Adams, Missy Higgins and numerous other bands. Lol Tolhurst, a founding member of The Cure, stated that Porter was the producer for the second album recorded by another of his bands, Presence.

In 1983, Porter married the British model, Linda Keith.

Selected discography

1970-1989
 1973 These Foolish Things – Bryan Ferry
 1975 Sunny Side of the Street – Bryn Haworth
 1983 Fire Dances – Killing Joke
 1984 The Smiths – The Smiths 
 1984 Everybody Is Fantastic – Microdisney
 1985 Hatful of Hollow – The Smiths (compilation album, selected tracks only)
 1985 Meat Is Murder – The Smiths ("How Soon Is Now?" only)
 1986 The Queen Is Dead – The Smiths ("Frankly Mr Shankly" only)
 1986 Talking With the Taxman About Poetry – Billy Bragg
 1987 Eye of the Hurricane – The Alarm
 1987 Bingo Durango – Bingo Durango
 1987 Louder Than Bombs – The Smiths (compilation album, selected tracks only)
 1987 The World Won't Listen – The Smiths (compilation album, selected tracks only)
 1989 The Ocean Blue – The Ocean Blue (Drifting, Falling) (The Office of a Busy Man)

1990-1999
 1991 School of Fish – School of Fish
 1991 Damn Right, I've Got the Blues – Buddy Guy (Grammy Winner)
 1992 Drenched – Miracle Legion
 1992 Best of The Smiths Vol. 1 & 2 – The Smiths (compilation albums, selected tracks only)
 1993 Dancing the Blues – Taj Mahal (Grammy Nominee)
 1993 Feels Like Rain – Buddy Guy (Grammy Winner)
 1994 Ain't Enough Comin' In – Otis Rush (Grammy Nominee)
 1994 Keb' Mo' – Keb' Mo'
 1994 Meet Me at Midnite – Maria Muldaur (Grammy Nominee)
 1994 Return to the Valley of the Go-Go's – The Go-Go's
 1994 Simpatico – Velocity Girl
 1995 Good Girl – The Go-Go's
 1995 Singles – The Smiths (compilation album, selected tracks only)
 1995 Sweet and Tender Hooligan – The Smiths
 1996 Just Like You – Keb' Mo' (Grammy Winner)
 1996 No Doy – moe.
 1996 This Can't Be Life – Wild Colonials (Co-produced with Tony Berg)
 1996 Phantom Blues – Taj Mahal (Grammy Winner)
 1997 Blues For the Lost Days – John Mayall
 1997 Deuces Wild – B.B. King (Grammy Nominee)
 1997 Señor Blues – Taj Mahal (Grammy Winner)
 1998 Smile Like Yours – John Lee Hooker
 1998 Blues on the Bayou – B.B. King (Grammy Winner)
 1998 Silver Tones: The Best of John Mayall – John Mayall
 1999 Moonburn – Jon Cleary and the Absolute Monster Gentlemen
 1999 Reaching to the Converted – Billy Bragg
 1999 Time to Burn – Jake Andrews

2000-2009
 2000 End of Bliss – Wonderland
 2000 Makin' Love is Good For You – B.B. King (Grammy Winner)
 2000 Wish I Was in Heaven Sitting Down – R. L. Burnside (Grammy Nominee)
 2001 Dot Com Blues – Jimmy Smith (Grammy Nominee)
 2001 Double Dealin'  – Lucky Peterson (Grammy Nominee)
 2001 Down to Earth (Limited Edition) – Ozzy Osbourne
 2002 Dirty Sexy Nights in Paris – Audiovent
 2002 Jon Cleary and the Absolute Monster Gentlemen – Jon Cleary and the Absolute Monster Gentlemen
 2003 Los Lonely Boys – Los Lonely Boys (Grammy Winner)
 2003 Love is Hell Pt. 1 & 2 – Ryan Adams (Grammy Nominees)
 2003 Martin Scorsese Presents the Blues – Red, White, and Blues (Grammy Winners)
 2003 Punch the Clock – Elvis Costello
 2004 Los Lonely Boys – Los Lonely Boys (Grammy Nominee)
 2004 Keep It Simple – Keb' Mo' (Grammy Winner)
 2004 Pin Your Spin – Jon Cleary and the Absolute Monster Gentlemen
 2005 All That I Am – Carlos Santana
 2005 Live at the Filmore – Los Lonely Boys
 2005 Man Alive! – Stephen Stills
 2005 The Sound of White – Missy Higgins
 2006 Out of the Shadows – Phantom Blues Band
 2006 Sacred – Los Lonely Boys
 2006 Suitcase – Keb' Mo' (Grammy Nominee)
 2007 Painkiller – Tommy Castro
 2007 So Many Nights – The Cat Empire
 2007 Still Making History – Ana Popovic

2010-2019
 2011 Live at Chickie Wah Wah – Meschiya Lake and Tom McDermott
 2012 Blind Sighted Faith – The Dunwells
 2015  Ain’t Bad Yet  – Micke Bjorklof & Blue Strip

Roxy Music discography
Porter is credited on the following Roxy Music and Bryan Ferry works:
 For Your Pleasure These Foolish Things 
 In Search of Eddie Riff (1974 Version) 
 Another Time, Another Place 
 In Search of Eddie Riff (1975 Version) 
 Let's Stick Together 
 In Your Mind 
 A Song For Europe In Search of Eddie Riff'' (2000 CD Version)

References

External links
 Viva Roxy Music profile
 John Porter's official website

1947 births
Living people
Musicians from Leeds
English bass guitarists
English male guitarists
Male bass guitarists
English record producers
The Smiths
Alumni of King's College London
Alumni of Newcastle University
People educated at Mount St Mary's Catholic High School, Leeds